The David Casavant Archive is the private clothing collection of stylist David Casavant, located in New York City and was established in 2014. It actively loans garments to celebrities, designers, and stylists for editorial work. The Archive contains several thousand pieces of vintage men's clothing, primarily works by Belgian designer Raf Simons, and Austrian designer Helmut Lang. Working as a stylist, Casavant identified the opportunity for establishing a vintage men's archive, since there wasn't one in New York at the time. Celebrity clients include Kanye West, Rihanna, Paul McCartney, Travis Scott, Lorde, Big Sean, Young Thug, Pharrell, Kendrick Lamar, Kim Kardashian. Two vintage Helmut Lang denim jackets were worn by Kanye West and Paul McCartney in the music video for FourFiveSeconds, performed by Rihanna, West, and McCartney

References

Fashion organizations
2014 establishments in New York City
Clothing-related organizations